Verity Helen Firth  (born 28 August 1973) is the Pro Vice-Chancellor (Social Justice and Inclusion) at the  University of Technology Sydney. She was the chief executive officer of the Public Education Foundation in Australia and is a former politician.

Firth served as a member of the New South Wales Legislative Assembly representing the electorate of Balmain for the Labor Party from 2007 to 2011. During this period, she served as Minister for Women, Minister for Science and Medical Research, and Minister Assisting the Minister for Health (Cancer) from 2007 to 2008, Minister for Climate Change and the Environment in 2008, and as the Minister for Education and Training from 2008 to 2011.

Career
Firth became a member of the Labor Party at the age of 15. She studied at North Sydney Girls High between 1986 and 1991, before studying Arts/Law at the University of Sydney between 1992 and 1998. While at university, she was active in student politics. After graduating, she worked as a political staffer, prior to working as an articled clerk at Slater & Gordon in 2001; she then worked as a campaign organiser for the Australian Labor Party (2001–2004). Between 2004 and 2007, she practised as a solicitor with Slater & Gordon, specialising in asbestos litigation and industrial law.

Firth was elected as a councillor of the City of Sydney in 2004. During her tenure on Council, she served for a period as Deputy Lord Mayor. Prior to entering state politics, she served on the board of the Law and Justice Foundation and Aidwatch.

Firth was elected to the new seat of Balmain on 24 March 2007.  Though there was a swing away from the Labor, she won the seat with a majority of just below 4%.  She was sworn in on 2 April 2007, receiving simultaneous appointment as Minister for Women, Minister for Science and Medical Research, Minister Assisting the Minister for Health (Cancer) and Minister Assisting the Minister for the Environment, Climate Change and Water (Environment).

On 22 February 2008, Phil Koperberg, Minister for the Environment, Climate Change and Water, resigned from cabinet due to ill health. Firth was subsequently appointed as Minister for Environment and Climate Change.

Following the caucus election of Nathan Rees as Leader of the NSW Labor Party and Premier in September 2008 and ensuing New South Wales government reshuffle, Firth was appointed as Minister for Education and Training. She won early praise for her demand to the federal government that it fund state public schools to the same level as private schools. During her tenure as Education Minister, she was regarded as a future Labor leader. Firth retained the Education portfolio under Rees' successor, Kristina Keneally.

During early 2009, the then Rees Labor Government announced the CBD Metro project. Controversial from the start, the CBD Metro project dominated the Sydney news for much of the year. Firth received media coverage for her opposition to the CBD metro, in the event that it would mean a bus interchange at Rozelle (due to the urban density of the area). Firth was also perceived as being at odds with economically conservative sections of the NSW Cabinet after her opposition to the privatisation of Sydney Ferries became public; at the time, the option of privatising Sydney's ferry fleet was examined by the NSW government against the opposition of unions and some residents. The Keneally government subsequently announced that the ferries would not be privatised.

Firth was defeated by Jamie Parker (representing the NSW Greens) as the Member for Balmain at the 2011 state election. After her defeat, Firth considered returning to work as a solicitor. Instead, however, she was appointed as CEO of the Public Education Foundation, an advocacy organisation providing scholarships for students in need of financial assistance.

In May 2014, Firth won Labor preselection for the seat of Balmain in the 2015 state election. She lost the election to the sitting member, Jamie Parker of the Greens.

Firth was appointed a Member of the Order of Australia in the 2023 Australia Day Honours.

Personal life
Firth grew up in West Pymble and in Glebe. She lives in Glebe with her husband Matthew Chesher and their two children.

Her brother is Charles Firth, a comedian and member of The Chaser. Her aunt is Meredith Burgmann, the former NSW upper house president. Firth is the great-granddaughter of Anglican Bishop Ernest Burgmann.

In January 2011 Firth's husband, Matthew Chesher, was charged by police for possession of the illegal drug, ecstasy. Chesher resigned immediately as chief of staff to Minister for Roads David Borger. Firth said she was "angry, hurt and very disappointed". Verity refused to say how many tablets Chesher was buying and refused to say whether she had ever taken drugs. Chesher was charged with the possession of one ecstasy tablet and subsequently placed on a 12-month good-behaviour bond with no conviction being recorded.

References

External links
Inaugural Speech to Parliament
 Facebook page
 Twitter account

Members of the New South Wales Legislative Assembly
Australian chief executives
21st-century Australian lawyers
Labor Left politicians
Living people
People from Sydney
1973 births
Members of the Order of Australia
People educated at North Sydney Girls High School
Australian Labor Party members of the Parliament of New South Wales
21st-century Australian politicians
Women members of the New South Wales Legislative Assembly
Deputy Lord Mayors of Sydney
21st-century Australian women politicians